Marko Stojanović may refer to:

 Marko Stojanović (actor) (born 1971), Serbian celebrity
 Marko Stojanović (footballer, born 1994), German-Serbian footballer
 Marko Stojanović (footballer, born 1998), Serbian footballer

See also
 Mirko Stojanović (born 1939), Croatian footballer